Pachynoa purpuralis is a moth in the family Crambidae. It was described by Francis Walker in 1866. It is found in Indonesia (Java), Thailand, West Malaysia, Borneo, Sumatra and the Philippines.

References

Moths described in 1866
Spilomelinae
Moths of Borneo
Moths of Malaysia